The Pazin Castle (german: Mitterburg) is a medieval fortification built on a solid rock situated in the middle of the town of Pazin, the administrative seat of Istria County, Croatia. It is the largest and best-preserved castle in that westernmost Croatian county.

It overlooks the deep gorge of the Pazinčica Foiba river, a small karst subterranean river that disappears there through sinkhole and continues underground.

The fortified structure was constructed of hewn stone, and, during its 11-century-long history, subjected to several major reconstructions and renovations. There are two museums to be visited in Pazin's castle, the Ethnographic Museum of Istria and the Pazin Town Museum.

History

The Pazin Castle was first mentioned as Castrum Pisinum on 7 June 983 in a document issued by Otto II, Holy Roman Emperor, confirming the possession of the castle to bishop of Poreč. In the 12th century the bishops of Poreč ceded it to Meinhard of Schwarzenburg, owner of Črnigrad Castle (German: Schwarzenburg), then to Meinhard I, Count of Gorizia, and finally to Meinhard, Margrave of Istria (d. 1193) and his successors. 

In 1374 Albert IV, Margrave of Gorizia, died without successors and the castle was inherited by the members of the House of Habsburg. They rented or mortgaged it many times during the next few centuries to various noblemen closely related to them, among which were members of families Auersperg, Barbo, Della Torre, Devinski, Durr (Dürrer), Eggenberg, Flangini, Fugger, Khevenhüller, Mosconi, Swetkowitz, Turinetti de Prie and Walsee.

The castle was finally sold to Antonio Laderchi de Montecuccoli in 1766 for 240 florins and remained the property of his family until 1945. In the meantime, various countries around the castle changed many times over the last more than 200 years: after the end of the Venetian Republic in 1797, Pazin belonged to the Habsburg monarchy, then to Napoleon's French Empire, again to the Habsburg Monarchy, in 1918 to Italy, in 1945 to Yugoslavia, and in 1991 to Croatia.

For many centuries the castle was the administrative seat of the County of Pazin (Croatian: Pazinska grofovija/Pazinska knežija; Italian: Contado di Pisino; German: Grafschaft Mitterburg) or County of Istria (Croatian: Istarska grofovija/Istarska knežija; Italian: Contea d' Istria; German: Grafschaft Isterreich), governed either by a castle captain castellan, or the count himself.

Gallery

See also
 List of castles in Croatia
 Timeline of Croatian history
 Military history of Croatia
 House of Montecuccoli

External links 
 Present form of the Pazin Castle was built in the 16th century
 Pazin Castle – the largest and best preserved medieval fortified structure in Istria County  
 Travellers often visit the castle
 Pazin Castle – one of the several fortifications in Pazin and its surroundings
 Laderchi of Montecuccoli bought the castle in 1766
 Pazin Town Museum

Buildings and structures in Istria County
Pazin 
Medieval architecture
Castles in Croatia
Museums in Croatia